Billy Masetlha was the head of the South African National Intelligence Agency before being fired by South African President Thabo Mbeki in 2006.

See also
 National Intelligence Co-ordinating Committee
 National Intelligence Agency
 South African Bureau of State Security

References

South African spies
1954 births
Living people